Second Sight is a 2004 science fiction action-adventure stealth video game developed by Free Radical Design and published by Codemasters for GameCube, PlayStation 2, Xbox and Microsoft Windows. Players assume control of an American parapsychology researcher, who awakens in a medical facility with no memory of their past and powerful psychic abilities, and breaks out with these powers in order to uncover their past and their involvement in a mission they undertook with a specialist taskforce of the U.S. Marines. The game's action is divided between gun combat and stealth, with emphasis on players making use of different psychic abilities to survive against hostile opponents and overcoming obstacles and tricky puzzles.

The game's console entries have received mostly favorable reviews, while the PC version received mixed feedback.

Gameplay
In the game, players control the story's protagonist through a series of levels, in which the aim is to complete a series of tasks, dealing with hostile enemies and some minor puzzle-solving. The game's action is viewed through a third-person perspective, though at times players switch to a first-person viewpoint under certain conditions (i.e. crawling through a vent). Each level features different situations, ranging from full-scale combat situations, to the use of stealth and subterfuge to get around enemies and achieve important goals. When combat situations are inevitable in most levels, players can, along with engaging enemies in close combat, utilises a variety of fire-arms to deal with hostiles - pistols, sub-machine guns, assault rifles and sniper rifles - with gun combat featuring the ability to hide behind cover and a targeting system that allows players to lock-on to enemies and fine-tune their aim to hit specific body parts on an opponent. However, in levels where combat should be avoided, players engage in stealth by staying out of sight of enemies through the use of cover, with the ability to knock out opponents with a silenced tranquilliser gun (where available). In addition to enemies, player must also avoid security cameras; these can shut down if the player finds the computer terminal that controls them. If the player is spotted by an enemy/camera when trying to be stealthy, an alarm is triggered that not only increases the number of enemies in the section of the level that the player is in, but also causes all enemies to seek them out and engage them; the alarm is only cancelled out when enemies cannot find the player after a period of time. In some levels, the player must solve a minor puzzle, which may involve anything such as finding a password to operate a computer system.

Second Sights most unique aspect of gameplay is the protagonist's ability to use a variety of psychic powers, which can used either to aid the player in combat, avoid detection, and help to solve some puzzles. At the start of the game, the player begins with only a few powers, but unlock new ones and upgrades to those they possess as the story progresses. Such powers drain the players psychic energy either in a set amount or over time; if the player is drained of psychic energy, then they are momentarily stunned for a few seconds, leaving them vulnerable. One unique power that the players gain access to at the start of the game is the ability to heal themselves, which is later upgraded to allow the player to heal allies that they have in later stages of the game; in some of the earlier stages, players do not possess psychic abilities, meaning that any damage they take can only be healed by finding first aid kits within the level.

Plot

Setting
The game takes place in a world in which parapsychology exists, and secret research projects on the subject were conducted during the Soviet era after World War II and uncovered proof that powerful psychic abilities could be transferred genetically into other subjects. The events of the story take place across locations within the United States and Siberia, as well as a training base in Germany, between two different points in the same year within the late 1990s. The game's main antagonist is a fictional US agency called the National Security Executive (NSE), which seeks for its own ends the parapsychology research that was conducted.

Story
American parapsychology researcher John Vattic awakens inside an isolation cell of a medical facility in Virginia, with no recollection of his past or identity. Discovering he possess powerful psychic abilities of unknown origin, Vattic uses them to break free and explore the facility. While riding down in an elevator, he experiences a flashback that allows him to recover his identity.

The flashback makes him recall that he was recruited by the Pentagon six months ago to assist in an important mission being conducted by WinterICE - a special taskforce of U.S. Marines led by Colonel Joshua Starke, and his psychic adviser Jayne Wilde. The taskforce had been given orders to travel to Siberia to recover Victor Grienko, a renowned Russian scientist seeking political asylum with the United States, who had conducted extensive research into parapsychology. Back in the present, Vattic gains access to the facility's patient records, only to learn Wilde died during the mission in an ambush by Russian troops.

Experiencing another flashback in which he prevents Wilde's death, Vattic is shocked to find her records changed in the present. Learning that her survival only led to her being incarcerated at a mental asylum in Vermont upon returning to the United States, Vattic works to escape the facility in order to rescue Wilde. Traveling to the asylum, Vattic finds her in a cell, having suffered trauma that had left her mentally frail, Vattic works to break her out, bringing her to the sewers beneath the asylum.

Upon returning to her senses, Wilde recognizes Vattic and tells him how he and Starke were ambushed the first night on the mission, resulting in Starke's death. Recalling the incident in a flashback, Vattic and Starke investigated the area after countering the ambush, whereupon Vattic encountered a psychic projection from one of Grienko's child subjects in a disused rail tunnel. The child helps to awakens his dormant psychic abilities in the past, allowing him to save Starke. After the fight, both men discover the troops they fought were actually US Special Forces.

Returning to the present, Wilde reveals to Vattic that Starke survived, but was court-martialed after the mission and went into hiding. Escaping pursuit by NSE agents, Vattic has Wilde bring him to Starke's hideout in Queens, New York. Vattic meets with Starke, who reveals the rest of the WinterICE team did not survive the mission. Vattic recalls in another flashback how WinterICE tracked down Grienko to a village called Dubrensk, and how he prevented the deaths of the team, only to discover the villagers slaughtered. A lone survivor, mortally wounded, pleaded with the group for their help to save a group of children, but insisted on Vattic handling the task alone, as only he could approach the children safely. In the present, Starke reveals the massacre in Dubrensk was conducted by Silas Hanson, the director of the NSE, who sought to steal Grienko's work, dubbed the "Zener Project", from a hidden research facility under the village, and used the surviving WinterICE team as scapegoats. Learning that the NSE covered up the incident and theft of the Zener Project, Vattic heads to the agency's headquarters in New Jersey for answers.

Vattic soon discovers that Hanson used the Zener Project to create a global army of psychic super soldiers, and has another flashback where he ventures into the research facility under Dubrensk. Rescuing some of the children, Vattic is led by them to Grienko, who mistakes him for one of Hanson's men and reveals he contacted Hanson in hopes of taking his research and children to the United States and continue his work with new funding. In the present, Vattic confronts Hanson, but finds himself powerless to stop him, as he holds Wilde hostage. Deciding to use his flashbacks to change the past and prevent Hanson from using the Zener Project, Vattic returns to the past and, knowing the truth, convinces Grienko that Hanson seeks only to take tissue samples before killing everyone on the project, moments before Grienko is murdered by Hanson's men. Proceeding to the lower levels, Vattic begins experiencing hallucinations of the present and the locations he visited.

Eventually, through hearing Wilde's voice, Vattic realizes that his perception of time is wrong, and that the present is actually a possible future being shown to him by his final psychic ability, precognition. Unbeknownst to him, the ability had been active the whole time and what he thought was the "past" was really the present. Wilde explains that Grienko's children had foreseen what Hanson planned to do and knew that only Vattic could stop him.

Now fully aware of the truth, Vattic confronts Hanson in Grienko's lab but finds him sealed behind a window impervious to bullets and psychic powers. Slowly overwhelmed by Hanson's men, Vattic releases the project's other children to help him, who then promptly use their powerful telekinesis abilities to reach Hanson and kill him. Returning to the surface, Vattic reunites with Starke and Wilde, who help him onto a helicopter leaving the area, while WinterICE and American troops arrive to secure the facility.

Development

THQ Nordic have acquired the rights to the game in August 2018. The deal gives THQ Nordic the rights to republish the game, in addition to making new games, if they want. In April 2021, THQ Nordic relisted the game on Steam.

Soundtrack
In 2006, Free Radical Design made the Second Sight soundtrack available for download on the company website, including printable album artwork.

In 2012, Graeme Norgate made the soundtrack available on his personal Bandcamp page.

Reception

Second Sight received "favorable" reviews on all platforms except the PC version, which received "average" reviews, according to review aggregator Metacritic.

In 2010, the game was included as one of the titles in the book 1001 Video Games You Must Play Before You Die.

Notes

References

External links

2004 video games
Action-adventure games
Codemasters games
Free Radical Design
GameCube games
PlayStation 2 games
Stealth video games
Video games about the United States Marine Corps
Video games scored by Graeme Norgate
Video games set in psychiatric hospitals
Video games set in Germany
Video games set in Russia
Video games set in Virginia
Video games set in New York City
Video games set in New Jersey
Video games set in Vermont
Windows games
Xbox games
Fiction about psychic powers
Video games about psychic powers
Video games developed in the United Kingdom
Single-player video games